Sumitra Marandi (born 25 October 1996) is an Indian footballer who plays as a defender for SSB Women Football Club. She has been a member of the India women's national team.

Club career
Playing for West Bengal, Sumitra scored an own goal during the semifinal match of the 2017–18 Senior Women's National Football Championship against eventual champions Tamil Nadu.

International career
Sumitra capped for India at senior level during the 2014 SAFF Women's Championship.

Honours

India
 SAFF Women's Championship: 2014

References

1996 births
Footballers from Jharkhand
Living people
India women's international footballers
Indian women's footballers
People from Dhanbad district
Sportswomen from Jharkhand
Women's association football defenders